Rikhakot is a village in Nainital district, Uttarakhand, India. It has the population of 479 people.

References 

Villages in Nainital district